Guadalupe Pérez Rojas (born 19 August 1994) is an Argentine former professional tennis player.

In her career, she won 13 doubles titles on the ITF Women's Circuit. On 18 May 2015, she reached her best singles ranking of world No. 410. On 15 May 2017, she peaked at No. 161 in the WTA doubles rankings.

Partnering Sofía Luini, Pérez Rojas won her first $50k tournament at the Paraguay Open, defeating Anastasia Pivovarova and Patricia Maria Țig in the 2014 final.

Playing for the Argentina Fed Cup team, Pérez Rojas has a win–loss record of 1–2.

ITF Circuit finals

Singles: 4 (4 runner-ups)

Doubles: 30 (13 titles, 17 runner-ups)

Notes

External links
 
 
 

1994 births
Living people
Sportspeople from Jujuy Province
Argentine female tennis players
21st-century Argentine women